Lakshmi Ravindra Hebbalkar is an Indian National Congress politician from Belagavi, Karnataka. She is also an MLA from Belgaum Rural Assembly constituency.

Personal life
She is married to Ravindra Hebbalkar and lives in Hanuman Nagar, Belagavi. She has one son Mirnal Hebbalkar.

Political career
Lakshmi Hebbalkar unsuccessfully contested from Belgavi (Rural) Vidhan Sabha seat in 2013, and then from Belagavi Lok Sabha seat in 2014. She was made Karnataka State women's Congress chief in May 2015. 
In 2018, she got elected to the Karnataka state assembly from Belgavi (Rural) Vidhan Sabha seat by defeating Sanjay Patil of BJP.

She was quizzed for two days by Enforcement Directorate (ED) in September 2019 in connection with a probe into a money laundering case.

External links
Election Watch Candidate Page

References

Living people
United Progressive Alliance candidates in the 2014 Indian general election
Indian National Congress politicians from Karnataka
People from Belagavi district
India MPs 2014–2019
21st-century Indian women politicians
21st-century Indian politicians
1975 births
Women members of the Karnataka Legislative Assembly